Yankee Run is an unincorporated community in Ellsworth County, Kansas, United States.  It is located on the west bank of the Kanopolis Lake.

Education
The community is served by Ellsworth USD 327 public school district.

See also
 Kanopolis Lake
 Kanopolis State Park
 Mushroom Rock State Park
 Venango, Kansas, located on east bank of Kanopolis Lake

References

Further reading

External links
 Ellsworth County maps: Current, Historic, KDOT

Unincorporated communities in Ellsworth County, Kansas
Unincorporated communities in Kansas